Bomb Factory is a band from Tokyo, Japan with styles influenced by 1970s and '80s hardcore punk, hard rock, and heavy metal music. Although their mother tongue is Japanese, almost all the music they have produced since 1997 has English song titles and lyrics.

History
Brothers Jun-ya and Kazuya grew up in Yamagata and later relocated to Tokyo, where they met Joe and Shira and established their band in 1991. They played shows in and around Tokyo and Yokohama during their early years. They released their independently produced EP, Explode a Bombshell in 1994 and the full album Blade of a Knife in 1996.
In 1997, Bomb Factory incorporated their own independent label, Monstar Records, and released the split CD Monstar Cup Stage 1. This album and concurrent albums afterward contained predominantly English lyrics. During the next few years their style progressed and became more distinctive, attracting a larger fan base in Japan. In 1999, they began the event High Blood Pressure in which they and other Japanese rock bands showcase in. They have staged several of these events and still continue it today.
In September 1999 they began individual tours in England, the Netherlands, Germany and Belgium, marking the first time the band toured outside Japan. Later in November they signed with Hell Hornet Records and Limited Records and released their self-titled mini album Bomb Factory, selling over 16,000 copies. In 2000, the tracks "Exciter", "Clumsy Bird" and "Deadly Silence Beach" were chosen from this album for the game Dead or Alive 2 on the Dreamcast and PlayStation 2 platforms, and an English version of the song "How Do You Feel" was made for the updated game, DOA2: Hardcore. In December they gained more recognition after opening for Bad Religion during their Japanese tour.
In 2001 they played many concerts and festivals in Japan with such groups as Uzumaki, Crispy Nuts, Shaka Labbits, Super Sisters, et al. In February 2002 Bomb Factory played in The Power to Explode tour with the band Fulltrap. After this came the Rough Tour, spanning 32 different venues with bands such as Buddha Head, Fulltrap, Batch, and Monkey Pirate.
Later in June of the same year the band began their second European tour in Germany, France and Belgium. While in France they played the Rock Oise Festival and received significant media coverage on radio, TV, and even made the cover of the magazine Walked In Line. Also in 2002, the tracks "Dive" and "Crack" were used in the PlayStation game entitled Super Shot Soccer. In October 2004 the album Discord (a compilation of the Fat Boost mini album and Discord maxi single) was released in France and their second tour of the country began soon after. In November 2004 the album Another Day, Another Life was released.
They signed with Sea Green/Toshiba-EMI in 2006 and on November 15 they simultaneously released the album Social Suicide alongside their first DVD, Fifteenth: After All These Years, commemorating the band's 15 year survival.
On November 28, 2007 they released their Greatest Hits compilation album which includes one previously unreleased song, "Fly". Bomb Factory signed a contract with Florida record label Bieler Bros in 2007, but later canceled. In May 2008, they signed with California label N2O Records and subsequently released Moshing Through Tokyo in August.

Band members
 Jun-ya - vocals
 Kazuya - guitar, vocals
 Joe - bass guitar, vocals
 Shira - drums, vocals

Discography

Studio albums
 Blade of a Knife (1996)
 Go This Way (2002)
 Another Day, Another Life (2004)
 Social Suicide (2006)
 Closed (2010)

See also 
 List of bands from Japan

References

External links
Bombfactory.jp, their official website
Bomb Factory's MySpace page

Japanese punk rock groups
Musical groups established in 1991
Japanese heavy metal musical groups
Musical groups from Tokyo
1991 establishments in Japan